is a Japanese actress and singer, who has been active since 1982. She is represented by Staff-up Group.

Filmography

 Sudden Shock! Monster Bus (1988) as Reiko
 Top Stewardess Monogatari (1990), series
 Konoyo no Hate (1994) as Kyoko Tanabe (series)
 Furuhata Ninzaburô (1996) as Hinako Mukai (series)
 Gekai Hiiragi Matasaburō (1996) as Minae Aoshima (mini series)
 Atashi wa Juice (1996)
 Mōri Motonari (1997) as Kaori (serie)
 Kyōtarō Nishimura's Travel Mystery 31 (1997), TV Movie
 Hasen no marisu (1999) as Aso, Kayoko
 Romance (1999) as Kotaro's Woman
 Taxi Driver's Mystery Diary 13 (2000), TV Movie
 Tadaima manshitsu (2000), series
 Kaseifu ha mita! 18 (2000) as Midori Mizuhara, TV Movie
 Furin chôsain Katayama Yumi 2: Kyoto - Tottori wain shinchū no nazo! (2001), TV Movie
 Madogiwa shinkin man no jiken chōbo (2002), TV Movie
 The Man in White Part 2: Requiem for the Lion (2003)
 The Man in White (2003)
 Maboroshi no suiri sakka: Noto satswujin gyō (2003), TV Movie
 Seventh Anniversary (2003) as Nana
 The Locker 2 (2004) as Nurse
 Gachapon (2004)
 Sodom the Killer (2004)
 Nibanme no Kanojo (2004)
 The Tax G-Men 12 (2005), TV Movie
 Watasareta bamen (2005) as Keiko, TV Movie
 Yonimo kimyō na monogatari: Aki no tokubetsu-hen (2005), TV Movie
 Onna keiji mizuki: Kyôto rakunishisho monogatari (2005) as Aoi, series
 Fugō keiji deluxe (2006) 
 Love My Life (2006) as San Senba
 Tokumei kakarichō Tadano Hitoshi (2007) as Kimiko koda
 Watch with Me: Sotsugyou shiashin (2007)
 Kekkon sagishi (2007) as Sumiko Mastukawa
 Tokyo Girl (2008) as Taeko Fujisaki, TV Movie
 4 shimai tanteidan (2008) as Kaori Tabuchi, series
 Kagari keibuho no jikenbo 4: Koto Kamakura Kiseki no seki satsujin suimyaku (2008), TV Movie
 Mama no kamisama (2008) as Misako Kojima, series
 Fukidemono to imouto (2008) as Miwako, TV Movie
 Taiyo to Umi no Kyoshitsu (2008) as Eri Tsuguhara, series
 Room of King (2008) como Maria Hijikata, series
 Shōni kyûmei (2008), series
 Kita arupusu sangaku kyûjotai Shimon Ikki 11: Tanigawadake Shiroumadake Jōnendake Nazo no satsujin messeji (2009), TV Movie
 Kujira: Gokudo no Shokutaku (2009)
 Geisha Koharu Nê san funtôki 6: Kaga vs Edo yuuzen satsujin jiken (2009), TV Movie
 Andante: Ine no senritsu (2010) as Itsuko Horikawa
 Thanatos (2011)
 The Third Woman (2011), TV Movie
 Atsuhime nanba 1 (2012)
 Actresses (2012) as Akiko Kaga
 Kōiki keisatsu 3 (2012) como Hiromi Isomura, TV Movie
 Jellyfish (2013) 
 Lieutenant Kenzō Yabe (2013), series
 Deep Red Love (2013)
 Hanasaki Mai ga damatteinai (2014), series
 Michinoku menkui kisha Miyazawa Ken'ichirō 3 (2014), TV Movie
 Time Spiral (2014), mini series
 Matsumoto Seichō Mystery Jidaigeki (2015), mini series
 Minami-kun no Koibito (2015), mini series
 The Payoff (2020)

Discography

Albums 
 ROLLING 80'S (1982)
 ONE NIGHT STAND (1982)
 THE 20th ANNIVERSARY (1982)
 4 SEASON (1983)
 POISON 21 (1984)
 ACT 13 (1984)
 Suisaiga (1984)
 Portrait(1986)
 Split Finger First Lady
 Golden☆Best (2015)

Singles 
 Silent Communication (1982)
 BEGINNING (1983)
 Jentoru ja i rarenai (1984)

References

External links
 Agent profile 
 Official Twitter

1963 births
People from Matsumoto, Nagano
Living people
20th-century Japanese actresses
20th-century Japanese women singers
20th-century Japanese singers
21st-century Japanese actresses
21st-century Japanese women singers
21st-century Japanese singers
Japanese women jazz singers
Japanese film actresses
Japanese television actresses